Epiparbattia oligotricha is a moth in the family Crambidae. It was described by Zhang and Li in 2005. It is found in China (Guizhou).

References

Moths described in 2005
Pyraustinae